The Republican Union (UR), later known as the Progressive Union  (UP), was a French parliamentary group founded in 1871 as a heterogeneous alliance of moderate radicals, former Communards and opponents of the French-Prussian Treaty.

History 
Formed in the early years of the French Third Republic, the Republican Union led by Léon Gambetta was strongly opposed to the Treaty of Frankfurt as much understanding to the Paris Commune, repressed by the moderate Adolphe Thiers. The party's electoral lists also included notable activists and intellectuals like Louis Blanc (elected with 216,000 votes), Victor Hugo, Giuseppe Garibaldi, Edgar Quinet, Pierre Waldeck-Rousseau, Émile Littré, Charles Floquet, Georges Clemenceau, Arthur Ranc and Gustave Courbet.

Initially on the extreme left of the Parliament of France, the group became close to the Opportunist Republicans of Jules Ferry in the late 1870s, causing a split of the far-left radicals led by Clemenceu. During the Gambetta government (1881–1882), René Goblet also broke away from the group to form the Radical Left.

After the 1885 legislative election, the Republican Union's popularity decreased while the Opportunists to their right increased their votes. In 1894, one of the last prominent members of the group, Gustave Isambert, renamed the Republican Union as the Progressive Union and with an handful of deputies and senators continued to pursue Gambetta's goals. However, changes in the political system led to a need for a big party of all liberals and when the Democratic Republican Alliance was created in 1901 the Opportunists and the Progressive Union merged into it.

Electoral history

Presidential elections

Legislative elections

See also 
 Democratic Republican Alliance
 Sinistrisme

References 

Defunct political parties in France
Political parties of the French Third Republic
Parliamentary groups in France
Republican parties
Radical parties in France
Left-wing parties in France
Political parties established in 1871
1871 establishments in France
Anti-clerical parties
Moderate Republicans (France)